I Like Fun is the twentieth studio album from New York City-based alternative rock band They Might Be Giants, released on January 19, 2018.

Background
The band began recording on April 3, 2017, at Reservoir Studios (former site of Skyline Studios), using the same studio space the band used to record Flood. In October 2017, the band confirmed the album was scheduled to be released January 19, 2018, along with the return of their Dial-A-Song service.

The album's track listing was revealed on October 23, alongside an early download of the track "I Left My Body".

Release

Before the release of the full album, 3 songs, with 1 having a music video, were uploaded to YouTube, with their uploads to iTunes following shortly afterward. The songs were, in order of release, "I Left My Body" (October 23, 2017),"Last Wave" (December 1, 2017), and "All Time What", the one with the music video (January 3, 2018).

I Like Fun was available for pre-release streaming on January 11, 2018. The album was released physically and digitally on January 19, 2018.

After the release of the full album, as part of Dial-A-Song 2018, They Might Be Giants continued to release videos for all but three of the songs.

Track listing

Personnel
They Might Be Giants
 John Flansburgh – vocals, guitars, etc.
 John Linnell – vocals, keyboards, woodwinds, etc.
Backing Band
 Marty Beller – drums, percussion
 Danny Weinkauf – bass
 Dan Miller – guitars
Additional musicians
 Curt Ramm – trumpet on 7, 15
 Chris Anderson – Mellotron on 14
Production
 Pat Dillett – production, mixing
 James Yost – engineering
 UE Nastasi – mastering
 Paul Sahre – design
 Joe Hollier – photography

Charts

References

2018 albums
Idlewild Recordings albums
They Might Be Giants albums
Albums produced by Pat Dillett